How Do We Tell Our Children? is a 1949 German comedy film directed by Hans Deppe and starring Leny Marenbach, Mathias Wieman and Hilde Körber. The film was made by the major German studio UFA in 1944, but was not released until several years after the end of the war.

The film's sets were designed by the art director Wilhelm Vorwerg. Shooting took place in the Babelsberg Studios and on location in Dresden and Switzerland.

Synopsis
In a suburb of Dresden, a widowed doctor with four children lives opposite a divorcee with three children. Gradually they fall in love despite the constant feuding between their children.

Cast
 Leny Marenbach as Käthe Westhoff
 Mathias Wieman as Dr. Thomas Hofer
 Hilde Körber as Adele
 Ernst Waldow as Diesing
 Babsi Schultz-Reckewell as Sigrid
 Edmund van Kann as Klaus
 Jürgen Tusch as Wölfchen
 Hans-Dieter Gotzmann as Erich
 Herbert Stetza as Theo
 Hans Neie as Kurt
 Jürgen Peter Jacoby as Pepi
 Franz Schafheitlin
 Alexa von Porembsky

See also
 Überläufer

References

Bibliography
 Holmstrom, John. The Moving Picture Boy: An International Encyclopaedia from 1895 to 1995, Norwich, Michael Russell, 1996.
 Rentschler, Eric. The Ministry of Illusion: Nazi Cinema and Its Afterlife. Harvard University Press, 1996.

External links 
 

1949 films
1949 comedy films
German comedy films
1940s German-language films
Films directed by Hans Deppe
UFA GmbH films
Films shot at Babelsberg Studios
German black-and-white films
1940s German films